Voie is a neighbourhood in the city of Kristiansand in Agder county, Norway. The neighborhood is located in the borough of Vågsbygd and in the district of Voiebyen. Voie lies along Norwegian County Road 456 and County Road 457. The only road to the island of Andøya goes past the neighborhood of Voie.  It lies northwest of Møvik and northeast of Steindalen.

References

Geography of Kristiansand
Neighbourhoods of Kristiansand